Sakani may refer to:
 Sakani, Kurdistan
 Sakani, West Azerbaijan